Lettuce Entertain You Enterprises (LEYE) is a restaurant group currently comprising 120 or more restaurants mainly located in the Chicago metropolitan area. It was founded by Rich Melman and Jerry A. Orzoff in 1971.

History

The first restaurant, R.J. Grunts in Lincoln Park, opened on June 10, 1971. It is still in operation, as of 2020.

The company lists nine original partners: Bill Higgins, Melman, Bill Frost, Bob Wattel, Charles Haskell, Orzoff, Marvin Magid, Danny Koval and Fred Joast.  By 1976 the company had 5 restaurants and a band called Fresh Lettuce.  The partners continued expanding the company's network of restaurants.  By the mid-1980s, the company employed over 2,000 people and had annual revenues of $40 million.  Since its founding the company has opened 130 restaurants, with 70 concepts.

The restaurants are unique and vary in price, theme, and cuisine.  However, they generally combine theatrical flair and good value.  LEYE currently owns, licenses or manages more than 100 establishments in Illinois, California, Arizona, Maryland, Virginia, Minnesota and Nevada, including Wildfire, Petterino's, RPM Italian, RPM Steak, Beatrix, Oyster Bah, Shaw's Crab House, and Everest.  Also among its creations are two restaurants in the Paris Casino on the Las Vegas Strip, Eiffel Tower and Mon Ami Gabi (an expansion of the flagship location in Chicago), Big Bowl, and L2O.

IN 2000, LEYE had 38 partners, 45 concepts, and 4,000 employees. It owns, operates and licenses 90 restaurant venues in the United States.  It has separate restaurant consulting and restaurant development companies.  The food court at Water Tower Place is among its operations.  1999 annual revenue estimates ranged from $145 to over $200 million.  2005 revenue estimates were $300 million, with 5000 employees and approximately $50 million in net earnings.

Restaurants
Lettuce Entertain You restaurants include:
Aba
Antico Posto
Beatrix
Beatrix Market
Big Bowl
Big Bowl Chinese Express
Bub City
Cafe Ba-Ba-Reeba!
 Community Canteen
Di Pescara
Eiffel Tower
El Segundo Sol
Ēma
Hub 51
Il Porcellino 
Joe's Seafood Prime Steak & Stone Crab - an offshoot of Joe's Stone Crab in Miami
Krispy Kreme (franchisee)
L. Woods 
Maggiano's Little Italy (consultant)
M Burger
Mon Ami Gabi
Osteria Via Stato
Pizzeria Portofino
Pizzeria Via Stato
R.J. Grunt's
Ramen-San
RPM Italian
RPM Seafood
RPM Steak
Shaw's Crab House
Stella Barra Pizzeria Santa Monica
Stripburger
Sushi-San
Tallboy Taco
The Dalcy
Three Dots and a Dash
Tokio Pub
Twin City Grill
Wildfire
Wow Bao

Sold/divested restaurants 
Corner Bakery Cafe
Petterino's

Closed restaurants 
A 1 Beanery
Reel Club
Nacional 27
Magic Pan Crepe Stand
Frankie's Scaloppine & Fifth Floor Pizzeria
Mity Nice Grill
Foodlife
Don & Charlie's
Tru (restaurant), closed 2017
L2O, closed 2014
Fritz That's It
Lawrence of Oregano
Jonathan Livingston Seafood
Oyster Bah
Naoki Sushi
Ben Pao
Scoozi!
Stella Barra Pizzeria Chicago
Stella Barra Pizzeria Hollywood
Tucci Benucch
Intro
The Eccentric
Hat Dance
Great Gritzbe's Flying Food Show
Un Grand Cafe
RJ Grunts (Glenview location)
Everest

See also
 Rick Tramonto

Notes

Companies based in Chicago
Restaurants in Chicago
Restaurants established in 1971
Restaurant groups in the United States
1971 establishments in Illinois